Alberto Natusch Busch (May 23, 1933 in Beni, Bolivia – November 23, 1994 in Santa Cruz, Bolivia) was a Bolivian general who served briefly as the de facto 55th president of Bolivia in 1979.

Background and earlier career

Natusch is of German and French descent, and nephew of former President of Bolivia Germán Busch, he was a career military officer who in the late 1970s rose to the rank of Colonel in the Bolivian Army. He was for many years a trusted member of the cabinet of the military dictator Hugo Banzer.

President of Bolivia following military coup

On November 1, 1979, Colonel Natusch executed a bloody coup d'état against the constitutional government of Dr. Wálter Guevara, which had been constituted by Congress just three months earlier and charged with guiding the country to elections in 1980. The stated reasons for the golpe were the alleged desire of President Guevara to extend his term beyond that established by Congress in order to enact long-term measures designed to stave off a growing economic crisis. Far more likely, it was a traditional right-wing coup staged by officers who had served in the long dictatorship of General Hugo Banzer (1971–78) and who had much to lose by an ongoing congressional investigation of alleged criminal and economic misdeeds committed during the "Banzerato."

In any case, the population resisted the Natusch coup rather heroically, led by a nationwide labor strike called by the Central Obrera Boliviana (COB) of Juan Lechín.

Failure of coup after 16 days

In the end, Natusch was able to occupy the Palacio Quemado for only sixteen days, after which he was forced to give up his quixotic struggle. The only face-saving concession he extracted from Congress was the promise that former president Guevara not be allowed to resume his duties. This condition was accepted and a new provisional president was found in the leader of the lower congressional house (the House of Deputies), Mrs. Lidia Gueiler. Almost universally reviled for the bloodshed he  unleashed in the name of his personal ambitions, Colonel Natusch withdrew from public life. In 1981, he led a military revolt against the regime of Luis García Meza Tejada, while failing to overthrow the regime, led to the resignation of Garcia Meza and his replacement by Celso Torrelio.

Retirement and death

Retired from the military, Natusch died in Santa Cruz on November 23, 1994, at the age of 61.

See also
 Government of Alberto Natusch Busch, 1979

References

Bibliography
Mesa José de; Gisbert, Teresa; and Carlos D. Mesa, "Historia De Bolivia," 5th edition.

1933 births
1994 deaths
20th-century Bolivian politicians
Bolivian military personnel
Bolivian people of French descent
Bolivian people of German descent
Government ministers of Bolivia
Leaders who took power by coup
Military College of the Army alumni
People from Vaca Díez Province
Presidents of Bolivia
Agriculture ministers of Bolivia